Fathammer was a video game publisher and developer based in Finland. They have developed game cell phones, the Tapwave Zodiac, and also the Gizmondo. Fathammer was acquired by Telcogames in June 2006, and X-Forge game development environment developed by Fathammer was sold to Acrodea. Fathammer's largest owners were the investment companies 3i and Nexit Ventures. The Finnish Independence Fund Sitra also invested more than EUR 1 million in the company, which had offices in Helsinki and Seoul, Korea.

Notable games
Chronicles of Narnia
Hockey Rage 2005
Tomb Raider: Legend
Toy Golf

References

Video game development companies
Video game publishers
Defunct video game companies of Finland